A shelf support is a fastener used to hang a shelf on the wall.

Types of shelf supports:
 L-shaped shelf supports are named shelf bracket and they are a subset of angle brackets
 Cabinet shelf support, wardrobe shelf support, shelf pin, shelf support peg, shelf support push, plug-in shelf support - when used in a wardrobe or cabinet
 The 32 mm system on frameless cabinets using 5 mm diameter studs spaced 32 mm apart

Fasteners
Furniture components